Gerhard 'Gerd' Kentschke (born 18 September 1942) is a retired German football player and coach. As a player, he spent nine seasons in the Bundesliga with Karlsruher SC, 1. FC Kaiserslautern and MSV Duisburg. The best league finish he achieved during those years was fifth place. He was banned for ten years in the match-fixing Bundesliga scandal of 1971, but his ban was lifted in less than a year.

References

External links
 

1942 births
Living people
German footballers
Karlsruher SC players
1. FC Kaiserslautern players
MSV Duisburg players
Bayer 04 Leverkusen players
German football managers
Bayer 04 Leverkusen managers
Bundesliga players
2. Bundesliga players
Association football midfielders